The Ira S. Wilson Ice Arena (affectionately known as The Ira) is an ice arena located on the campus of the State University of New York College at Geneseo (SUNY Geneseo). It is the home ice of the Geneseo Ice Knights, SUNY Geneseo's NCAA Division III men's ice hockey team. It is also used by the Geneseo/Livingston Blues Youth Hockey, as well as numerous students and residents of the town who take advantage of open skating hours during the week.

The arena has a listed capacity of 2,500 fans, and important Ice Knights hockey games routinely draw 2,000-2,500 fans from the college and the town. On top of a hockey game, fans are entertained by a pep band (a rarity at the Division III level) and numerous contests and giveaways between periods, including student broomball spectacles and the fan-favorite chuck-a-puck contest.

There is a 200-meter track running along the top perimeter of the stands.

College ice hockey venues in the United States
Sports venues in Livingston County, New York
Indoor ice hockey venues in New York (state)
Geneseo Knights